Amadou Koïta is a Malian politician. He has been the Malian Minister of Youth and Citizenship since July 7, 2016.

References

Living people
Government ministers of Mali
Year of birth missing (living people)
21st-century Malian people